Saint-Yves, Saint Ivo, or Sant'Ivo can refer to:

Christian saints
Saint Ivo of Chartres (c. 1040-1115), bishop of Chartres, feast day 23 May
Saint Ivo of Kermartin (1253-1303), patron saint of Brittany, lawyers and abandoned children, feast day 19 May

Churches

 Sant'Ivo alla Sapienza in Rome, dedicated to Ivo of Kermartin
 Sant'Ivo dei Bretoni in Rome, also dedicated to Ivo of Kermartin, a French national church

Surname

Saint-Yves (surname), a French surname

See also
 St Ives (disambiguation)
 Ivo
 Yves (disambiguation)